is a Japanese professional footballer who plays for Indonesian side Persikabo 1973.

Career statistics

Club

International Statistics

U17 International caps

U17 International goals

U16 International caps

U16 International goals

References

1998 births
Living people
Japanese footballers
Japan youth international footballers
Japanese expatriate footballers
Association football forwards
Singapore Premier League players
Gamba Osaka players
Vissel Kobe players
Albirex Niigata Singapore FC players
FK Radnički Niš players
Japanese expatriate sportspeople in Thailand
Expatriate footballers in Thailand
Japanese expatriate sportspeople in Singapore
Expatriate footballers in Singapore
Japanese expatriate sportspeople in Serbia
Expatriate footballers in Serbia